GIU may refer to:
 Gang intelligence unit
 Gelao Mulao language
 Government Investment Unit of Indonesia
 Sigiriya Airport, in Sri Lanka
 Giu (Mandaeism), a demon in Mandaeism